The Avenue Mohammed VI, formerly Avenue de France, is the major city thoroughfare of Marrakesh, Morocco. It is named after the King, Mohammed VI of Morocco. It has seen rapid development of residential complexes and many luxury hotels. Avenue Mohammed VI contains what is claimed to be the largest nightclub of Africa, Pacha Marrakech, a trendy club attracting young people and clubbers, featuring house and electro music. It also has two large cinema complexes, Le Colisée à Gueliz and Cinéma Rif, and the new shopping precinct, Al Mazar.

References

Streets in Marrakesh